Gomphonema is a genus of diatoms belonging to the family Gomphonemataceae.

The genus has cosmopolitan distribution.

Species
As accepted by WoRMS;

Gomphonema acceptatum 
Gomphonema acuminatum 
Gomphonema adhikarii 
Gomphonema affine 
Gomphonema africanum 
Gomphonema alavariense 
Gomphonema angkoricum 
Gomphonema angusticapitatum 
Gomphonema angusticlavatum 
Gomphonema angustissimum 
Gomphonema angustum 
Gomphonema anjae 
Gomphonema asiaticum 
Gomphonema augur 
Gomphonema auguriforme 
Gomphonema auritum 
Gomphonema balatonis 
Gomphonema berggreni 
Gomphonema berggrenii 
Gomphonema bergii 
Gomphonema bicepiformis 
Gomphonema bigutianchnensis 
Gomphonema bohemicum 
Gomphonema boreale 
Gomphonema brasiliensoide 
Gomphonema bukycanyona 
Gomphonema californicum 
Gomphonema candelariae 
Gomphonema cantalicum 
Gomphonema capitatum 
Gomphonema capitoccultum 
Gomphonema capsulare 
Gomphonema carolinense 
Gomphonema catarinensis 
Gomphonema changyangicum 
Gomphonema charcotii 
Gomphonema chemeron 
Gomphonema chinense 
Gomphonema clavatoides 
Gomphonema clavatuloides 
Gomphonema clavatum 
Gomphonema clerici 
Gomphonema clevei 
Gomphonema confusum 
Gomphonema correntinum 
Gomphonema dalatica 
Gomphonema darwinii 
Gomphonema delicatula 
Gomphonema dharwarensis 
Gomphonema dichotiforme 
Gomphonema difformum 
Gomphonema diminutum 
Gomphonema dirangense 
Gomphonema distincte-striatum 
Gomphonema dojranense 
Gomphonema doonense 
Gomphonema dubravicense 
Gomphonema eileencoxiae 
Gomphonema elegantissimum 
Gomphonema elongatum 
Gomphonema eriensioides 
Gomphonema evolutionense 
Gomphonema frequentiformis 
Gomphonema frickei 
Gomphonema gallaudi 
Gomphonema gandhii 
Gomphonema gautieriforme 
Gomphonema genestoermeri 
Gomphonema graciledictum 
Gomphonema grande 
Gomphonema gregarium 
Gomphonema hedinii 
Gomphonema heideni 
Gomphonema helveticum 
Gomphonema himalayaense 
Gomphonema hinziae 
Gomphonema hristovskii 
Gomphonema hubeicum 
Gomphonema idsbense 
Gomphonema indistinctum 
Gomphonema innata 
Gomphonema insigne 
Gomphonema insuetum 
Gomphonema insularum 
Gomphonema interruptum 
Gomphonema intricatoides 
Gomphonema intricatum 
Gomphonema italicum 
Gomphonema jablanicense 
Gomphonema jahniana 
Gomphonema johnsonii 
Gomphonema juettnerii 
Gomphonema juriljii 
Gomphonema kalahariense 
Gomphonema kallarense 
Gomphonema kaznakowi 
Gomphonema kerguelenensis 
Gomphonema kezlyae 
Gomphonema kociolekii 
Gomphonema kozufense 
Gomphonema lacifrigidum 
Gomphonema lacusrankala 
Gomphonema lacusrankaloides 
Gomphonema lacus-victoriense 
Gomphonema lagerheimei 
Gomphonema lagerheimii 
Gomphonema lapponicum 
Gomphonema latelanceolatum 
Gomphonema lateripunctatum 
Gomphonema liebscheri 
Gomphonema longiceps 
Gomphonema lujanensis 
Gomphonema lychnidum 
Gomphonema magniaqua 
Gomphonema magnifica 
Gomphonema mariovense 
Gomphonema martini 
Gomphonema matanensis 
Gomphonema mayamae 
Gomphonema megalobrebissonii 
Gomphonema meridionale 
Gomphonema metzeltinii 
Gomphonema microcapitatum 
Gomphonema microlanceolatum 
Gomphonema microlaticollum 
Gomphonema micropus 
Gomphonema minusculum 
Gomphonema minutum 
Gomphonema modicum 
Gomphonema moniliforme 
Gomphonema mutunensis 
Gomphonema nagpurense 
Gomphonema navicelloides 
Gomphonema naviculoides 
Gomphonema neotropicum 
Gomphonema nesophilum 
Gomphonema obesoccultum 
Gomphonema occidentale
Gomphonema olivaceum 
Gomphonema oregonicum 
Gomphonema oxycephalum 
Gomphonema paracapitatum 
Gomphonema paradaphnoides 
Gomphonema paraexilissimum 
Gomphonema parapygmaeum 
Gomphonema parasundaense 
Gomphonema paratergestinum 
Gomphonema parvicapitatum 
Gomphonema parvuliforme 
Gomphonema parvulum 
Gomphonema pelisteriense 
Gomphonema preliciae 
Gomphonema prespanense 
Gomphonema prowsei 
Gomphonema pseudacuminatum 
Gomphonema pseudaffine 
Gomphonema pseudoparvulum 
Gomphonema puiggarianum 
Gomphonema pusillum 
Gomphonema pygmaeoides 
Gomphonema qingyiensis 
Gomphonema raraense 
Gomphonema reediae 
Gomphonema resendei 
Gomphonema rexlowei 
Gomphonema rhombicum 
Gomphonema rimetiana 
Gomphonema ristovskae 
Gomphonema rostellatum 
Gomphonema russicum 
Gomphonema saparense 
Gomphonema saravathense 
Gomphonema scardicum 
Gomphonema semiapertum 
Gomphonema shanghaiensis 
Gomphonema shiwania 
Gomphonema sichuanenesis 
Gomphonema sichuanensis 
Gomphonema sierrianum 
Gomphonema sphaerophorum 
Gomphonema spicula 
Gomphonema spiculoides 
Gomphonema spirkovskae 
Gomphonema stauroneiforme 
Gomphonema staurophorum 
Gomphonema subapicatum 
Gomphonema subclavatum 
Gomphonema subinsigniforme 
Gomphonema sublaticollum 
Gomphonema submalayense 
Gomphonema subnaviculoides 
Gomphonema subodhii 
Gomphonema subramosum 
Gomphonema subtile 
Gomphonema svalbardense 
Gomphonema tamilense 
Gomphonema tenoccultum 
Gomphonema tenuis 
Gomphonema tergestinum 
Gomphonema truncatum 
Gomphonema tumens 
Gomphonema turgidum 
Gomphonema undulans 
Gomphonema validum 
Gomphonema vardarense 
Gomphonema variabilis 
Gomphonema varioreduncum 
Gomphonema vastum 
Gomphonema ventricosum 
Gomphonema vibrio 
Gomphonema vidarbhense 
Gomphonema williamsii 
Gomphonema witkowskii 
Gomphonema wuyiensis 
Gomphonema xiantaoicum 
Gomphonema xinjiangianum 
Gomphonema yangtzensis 
Gomphonema yaominae 
Gomphonema yberiense 
Gomphonema yunnaniana

Fossils
Several species are fossils.
Gomphonema jianghanense  †
Gomphonema jianghanensis  †
Gomphonema jilinense  †

References

Cymbellales
Diatom genera
Taxa named by Christian Gottfried Ehrenberg